Langal (Bengali for plough) was a Bengali leftist-literary magazine published from Kolkata in the early 20th century. It was edited by Kazi Nazrul Islam.

History
Langal started publication on 16 December 1925. Langal was the second magazine edited by Kazi Nazrul Islam, the first being Dhumketu. It was the official  publication of the Labour Swaraj Party. It published poems about the working class and articles on famous socialists and communists of the era. The first issue printed five thousand copies and sold them all. Rabindranath Tagore wrote a piece for magazine at the request of Kazi Nazrul Islam.

The last issue of the magazine was 21 January 1926. 

In May 2001, a book on the magazine, called Nazruler Langal, was published by Nazrul Institute. It was published on Kazi Nazrul Islams's hundred birth anniversary. The author was Mohammad Nurul Huda.

References

Kazi Nazrul Islam
Bengali-language newspapers published in India
Defunct newspapers published in India